Galayagudem is a village in Eluru district of the Indian state of Andhra Pradesh. It is located on the north side of district headquarters Eluru at a distance of 10 km. It is under of Eluru revenue division. The nearest train station is Denduluru(DEL) located at a distance of 5.44 Km.

Demographics 

 Census of India, Galayagudem has population of 2374 of which 1197 are males while 1177 are females.  Average Sex Ratio of Galayagudem village is 983. Population of children with age 0-6 is 269 which makes up 13.65% of total population of village. Literacy rate of Galayagudem village was 69.83% with 1470 literates.

References

Villages in Eluru district

1. pujari siva ganesh